In recent years, Peru has revised the official spelling for place-names originating from Aymara and the Quechuan languages. A standardized alphabet for done Quechua was adopted by the Peruvian government in 1975; a revision in 1985 moved to a three-vowel orthography.

K and q represent different sounds in most Andean languages: k is a velar stop , as in Spanish and English; q is a uvular stop . As Spanish does not have uvular , traditional spellings lose this distinction (although sometimes a double cc was used to represent the k-like sounds of Quechua that differed from the "plain k" sound known in Spanish; e.g., in place names such as Ccarhuacc, Chopcca, Cconocc, Llacce, Manyacc, Chihuilluyocc, Chilcahuaycco, etc.), and Quechua or Aymara sources must be consulted to select the right consonant. For instance, the Temple of the Sun in Cusco is called the Qurikancha in Quechua, with both sounds (quri "gold",  kancha "courtyard, enclosure"), and is spelled Coricancha in hispanicized spelling.

For instance, Quechua qucha 'lake' sounds to Spanish speakers like cocha, as in the sample Huiracocha below. Some sources, such as dictionary published by the Academia Mayor de la Lengua Quechua, still use the five-vowel 1975 orthography.

In Bolivia and Southern Peru, including Cuzco, there are three versions of all the stop consonants:  the basic unaspirated sounds (p, t, ch, k, q), an aspirated series spelled with an h (ph, th, chh, kh, qh);  and finally an ejective series spelled with an apostrophe (p', t', ch', k', q).  In Aymara and Southern Quechua, these are distinct sounds, making a total of 15 stop consonants, and these differences must be shown in the spelling:  in the example words below, the kh in khipu is not the same as the k in Inka or in Tiwanaku;  nor is the qh sound at the start of "qhapaq"  the same as the q sound at the start of "Qusqu".  In most regions north of Cusco, these variants do not exist, and only the basic unaspirated sounds are used.

These changes are considered to be part of a general process of spelling standardisation and reassertion of the right of these native languages to their own spelling system appropriate for their sound systems, which are very different from that of Spanish. This accompanies a growth of pride in the Andean heritage of these countries, and moves to recover the prestige of their indigenous languages. These spelling changes are part of the official alphabets for Quechua and Aymara in Peru, Bolivia and Ecuador, though debate continues on the extent to which they are to be used when writing in Spanish.

Regulations 
Today the Spanish spellings are in conflict with Peruvian law. According to Article 20 of Decreto Supremo No 004-2016-MC  (Supreme Decree) which approves the Regulations to Law 29735, published in the  official newspaper El Peruano on July 22, 2016,  adequate spellings of the toponyms in the normalized alphabets of the indigenous languages must progressively be proposed with the aim of standardizing the namings used by the National Geographic Institute (Instituto Geográfico Nacional, IGN). The IGN realizes the necessary changes in the official maps of Peru.

The following table shows examples of modern spellings of Aymara and Quechua expressions according to the normalized alphabets, their meanings and common Spanish spellings.

Quechuan and Aymaran Wikipedias are also a good example of using of the modern spelling.

References

External links
 Ima hinataq runasimita sumaqta qillqay How to write Quechua well.
 Quechua and Aymara Spelling With many more details and integrated sound files to listen to the pronunciations.

Spelling
Aymaran languages
Quechuan languages